The 2016 Nations Cup was the inaugural edition of the Nations Cup hosted in Malacca City, Malaysia from 3 to 5 June 2016. It was organised by MP & Silva with the under-21 teams of Malaysia, Singapore and Thailand as well as the Vietnam U-19 team, participating in the tournament. All matches were held at the Hang Jebat Stadium.

Thailand won the title by defeating hosts Malaysia 2–1 in the final.

Venue

Brackets

Semi-finals

Third place play-off

Final

References

External links
 

International association football competitions hosted by Malaysia
2016 in Malaysian football
June 2016 sports events in Asia